The 2014 Veikkausliiga was the 84th season of top-tier football in Finland. The league started on 6 April 2014 and ended on 25 October 2014. HJK Helsinki are the defending champions.

Teams
JJK were relegated to Ykkönen after finishing at the bottom of the 2013 season. Their place was taken by Ykkönen champions SJK.

Team summaries

Managerial changes

League table

Results

Matches 1–22

Matches 23–33

Statistics

Top scorers
Source: veikkausliiga.com

Top assists
Source: veikkausliiga.com

Monthly awards

Annual awards

See also
 2014 Ykkönen
 2014 Kakkonen

References

External links
RSSSF
Soccerway.com

Veikkausliiga seasons
Fin
Fin
1